The flat-tailed house gecko (Hemidactylus platyurus), also known as the frilled house gecko or Asian house gecko, is a species of Gekkonidae native to southeastern and southern Asia. The species is sometimes classified under the genus Cosymbotus.

Description

Snout longer than the distance between the eye and the ear opening, one time and a half the diameter of the orbit; forehead concave; ear-opening small, oval, oblique. Rostral four-sided, not twice as broad as high, with median cleft above; nostril bordered by the rostral, the first labial and three nasals. Nine to eleven upper and seven or eight lower labials; mental large. triangular or pentagonal; two pair of chin-shields, the median pair large, in contact with each other, the posterior pair small, sometimes separated from the labials. Body depressed, covered above with uniform small granules, largest on the snout; a dermal expansion from axilla to groin and another along the posterior side of the hind limb. Ventral scales cycloid, imbricate. Male with an uninterrupted series of 34—36 femoral pores. Tail depressed, flat inferiorly, with sharp denticulated lateral edge, covered above with uniform small granules, below with a median series of transversely dilated plates. Limbs moderate, depressed; digits strongly dilated,  about  half-webbed, inner well developed; 3 to 6 lamellae under the inner, 7 to 9 under the median digits. Grey above, marbled with darker grey; generally a dark streak from eye to shoulder. Lower parts white. Length of head and body 61 mm.; tail 66 mm.

Distribution
Bangladesh, N India (Darjeeling, Sikkim), Nicobar Islands, Nepal, Bhutan,
China (Guangdong, SE Xizang = Tibet),Taiwan, Sri Lanka, Thailand, Cambodia (កម្ពុជា), Malaysia (incl. Pulau Tioman), Burma (= Myanmar), Vietnam, New Guinea (?),
Philippine Islands (Palawan, Calamian Islands, Panay, Luzon),
Indonesia (Sumatra, Java, Sulawesi, Lombok, Sumbawa, Flores).

They are also introduced in Florida (Pinellas, Alachua, Lee, Broward, and Miami-Dade counties) in the USA.

As a pet
These geckos are frequently found in the pet trade, including corporate chain stores, usually identified only as "house gecko".  While there are other species of gecko available under the same common name, the Cosymbotus platyurus is easily identified by the flaps of skin along its sides, making them resemble a miniature flying gecko (genus Ptychozoon).  They are easily maintained in a terrarium with frequent misting and insect prey, but they are not easy to handle.  Also, herpetoculturists often use this species in addition to anoles as a feeder lizard for some species of snakes, especially Asian green vine snakes (Ahaetulla prasina).

Notes

References
 Anderson, J. 1871 A list of the reptilian accession to the Indian Museum, Calcutta, from 1865 to 1870, with a description of some new species. J. Asiat. Soc. Bengal, Calcutta, 40, part 11(1): 12-39.
 Annandale, N. 1907 Reports on a collection of batrachia, reptiles and f ish from Nepal and the western Himalayas. Lacertilia. Records of the Indian Museum, 1:151-155
 Kober, I. 2004 Der Saumschwanz-Hausgecko (Cosymbotus platyurus): Haltung und Nachzucht im Terrarium und im Freilauf. Draco 5 (18): 68-75
 Krysko, K.L. And Keidra J. Daniels 2005 A Key to the Geckos (Sauria: Gekkonidae) of Florida. Caribbean Journal of Science 41 (1): 28-36
 Myers, George Sprague 1943 The Lizard Names Platyurus and Cosymbotus. Copeia 1943 (3):192
 Schneider, J.G. 1797 Amphibiorum Physiologiae Specimen Alterum Historiam et Species Generis Stellionum seu Geckonum Sistens. Frankfurt (Oder), C. L. F. Aitzi (2): 30

External links
 A technical description (1980) of the species, as found on the island of Komodo. The heading is the older name of Platyurus platyurus, but note the near-identical forelimb (A.) as the one depicted above.
Baby Cosymbotus platyurus Photos
Adult Cosymbotus platyurus Photos

Geckos
Articles containing video clips
Reptiles described in 1797